Wang Xiaomei (born 20 August 2000) is a Chinese cyclist. She represented China at the 2020 Summer Paralympics.

Career
She won a silver medal in the women's individual pursuit C1–3 event at the 2020 Summer Paralympics.

References

Living people
2000 births
Paralympic silver medalists for China
Paralympic cyclists of China
Chinese female cyclists
Paralympic medalists in cycling
Cyclists at the 2020 Summer Paralympics
Medalists at the 2020 Summer Paralympics
21st-century Chinese women